The Silver Logie for Most Popular Presenter is an award presented annually at the Australian TV Week Logie Awards. The award recognises the popularity of a presenter, co-host or judge of an Australian program.

It was first awarded at the 45th Annual TV Week Logie Awards, held in 2003 when the award was originally called Most Popular Presenter. It was briefly renamed Best Presenter (2016-2017). From 2018, the award category name was reverted to Most Popular Presenter.

The winner and nominees of Most Popular Presenter are chosen by the public through an online voting survey on the TV Week website. Rove McManus holds the record for the most wins, with seven.

Winners and nominees

Multiple wins/nominations

References

Awards established in 2003